Legburthwaite is a village in the Allerdale district, in the county of Cumbria. It is located on the A591 road and the B5322 road. Legburthwaite has a disused place of worship and formerly, a youth hostel. It is just north of Thirlmere.

References 

Villages in Cumbria
Allerdale